The 1912 Croatian First League season was the first to be organized by the Croatian Football Federation. Despite the championship being abandoned before its completion, HAŠK Zagreb was declared the champion.

League

See also
Prva HNL
Croatian Football Federation

External links
Croatia Domestic Football Champions

1912
Croatian First League
1911–12 in European association football leagues
1912–13 in European association football leagues
1911–12 in Hungarian football
1912–13 in Hungarian football